Emma was an abbess of Shaftesbury Abbey at the beginning of the 12th century. It is not certain, but it is possible that she was the successor of Eulalia after her death in 1106. A charter of King Henry I of England in 1121-1122 mentions her.

The abbey owned a large quantity of land, which was leased to tenants in order to provide income to the abbey. The charter from the king related to a number of lawsuits that Emma conducted against various tenants of the abbey's lands who had appropriated the land for themselves; the charter given by the king affirmed the abbey's ownership of the lands in question.

References
 Studies in the Early History of Shaftesbury Abbey, Dorset County Council, 1999

Abbesses of Shaftesbury
12th-century English people
12th-century English women